The Raleigh mayoral election of 1999 was held on November 5, 1999, to elect a Mayor of Raleigh, North Carolina. The election was non-partisan. It was won by Paul Coble, who replaced Tom Fetzer after beating Stepanie Fanjul.

Results

References

1999
Raleigh
1999 North Carolina elections
November 1999 events in the United States